is a Japanese voice actress affiliated with Kenyuu Office. She currently plays Sarada Uchiha in Boruto: Naruto Next Generations.

Filmography

Anime
Konjiki no Gash Bell!! (2003)
Digimon Universe: Appli Monsters (2016) (Gatchmon)
Chaos;Child (2017) (Yūto Tachibana)
Magical Girl Special Ops Asuka (2019) (Sacchū)
Insect Land (2022) (Maxime)

Unknown date
Aikatsu! (Miu Hanazuki)
Air Gear (Akito/Agito Wanijima)
Aria the Origination (Boy B)
Ayakashi (Jiroukichi)
Bakugan Battle Brawlers (Makoto)
Bobobo-bo Bo-bobo (girlfriend)
Boruto: Naruto Next Generations (Sarada Uchiha, embroidery shop woman, Yuina Itomaki)
Coyote Ragtime Show (August)
Cross Ange (Tomomi)
Digimon Savers (Chika Daimon)
Digimon Xros Wars (Sparrowmon/Pickmon)
Digital Monster X-Evolution (Kokuwamon X)
Eyeshield 21 (young Sena Kobayakawa, Haruko)
Futari wa Pretty Cure
Futari wa Pretty Cure Max Heart (Pation)
Futari wa Pretty Cure Splash Star (boy)
Ghost Hunt (Kenji)
Ginga e Kickoff!! (Takuma Aoto Gonzalez)
HeartCatch PreCure! (Potpourri)
Lovely Complex (Umibōzu's child)
Marvel Disk Wars: The Avengers (Noriko Ashida / Surge)
Mushishi (Fusa)
One Piece (Lina, Toko)
Queen's Blade (Hachiel)
Shinryaku! Ika Musume (Kiyomi Sakura)
Shinryaku!? Ika Musume (Kiyomi Sakura)
Shura no Toki - Age of Chaos (young Miyamoto Iori)
Star☆Twinkle PreCure as (Doggy)
Sugar Sugar Rune (Akira Mikado)
Toriko (Kruppoh)
Yu-Gi-Oh! 5D's (Tenpei Hayano)
Zoobles! (Mikey, Rin, Mill)

Films
HeartCatch PreCure! the Movie: Fashion Show in the Flower Capital...Really?! (????) (Potpourri)
Pretty Cure All Stars DX3: Deliver the Future! The Rainbow-Colored Flower That Connects the World (????) (Potpourri)
Pretty Cure All Stars New Stage: Friends of the Future (????) (Potpourri)
The Last: Naruto the Movie (????) (Boruto Uzumaki)
Boruto: Naruto the Movie (????) (Sarada Uchiha)

Video games
World's End Club (????) (Chuko)
God Eater Burst (????) (Player Character)
Rockman ZX Advent ((????)  the Hedgeroid)

Drama CDs
 (????)
 (????)

Dubbing roles

Live-action
Dark Skies (Sam Barrett)

Animation
Over the Garden Wall (Gregory)

References

External links
 
Kokoro Kikuchi at GamePlaza Haruka Voice Acting Database 

1982 births
Living people
Voice actresses from Tokyo
Japanese video game actresses
Japanese voice actresses